John James White (9 June 1887 – 28 January 1950) was an Australian rules footballer who played with Richmond in the Victorian Football League (VFL).

Notes

External links 
		

1887 births
1950 deaths
Australian rules footballers from Victoria (Australia)
Richmond Football Club players